Hogben toad can mean:

 A newsletter of Macquarie University Students Council, see Macquarie University Campus Experience#Hogben Toad
 Xenopus laevis, a toad used by Hogben for pregnancy testing, after which the newsletter was named